Desert City is a plant nursery and botanical garden located in Madrid, Spain that cultivates and sells xerophytic plants. Desert City has over 600 species, including cacti, succulents and native plants from the Mediterranean region. It is Europe's largest cactus garden. Desert City's greenhouses and gardens have been awarded numerous awards for architectural design.

History 
Desert City was founded by Jacobo García-Germán, an Madrileño architect, and Mercedes García, a former pharmaceuticals executive.
García-Germán, García, and a dedicated team worked together to create the biotechnological nursery specialized in xeriscaping. The nursery is also a site for plant research and cultivation of cacti and other xerophytic plants.

The garden 

The garden combines elements of the natural landscapes of the arid and semi-arid areas of the planet (such as cacti), with native plants from the Mediterranean climate, like lavender, rosemary and others. 
The garden is divided into 5 main thematic areas:
  
 Arizona, the highlights of this garden are cacti of various shapes, colors and textures. Three hills dominate this space, culminating at its apex with columnar-type cacti of different species and origins.
 Oasis, a recreational environment for walkers. This space contains a palm forest with a bird nesting environment and a waterfall. All the exhibition elements have been designed to create an atmosphere of seclusion.
 Taverns, a minimalist space that breaks with the organic aesthetics of the rest of the garden. The orthogonal line of water limits the garden space and creates a transitional link between the two design concepts. Cleistocactus, Echinopsis, Cephalocereus and other small xerophytes contrast with the black ground cover. The reflections of the plants in the polished sheets of cover provide fugitive effects of light at dawn. The mysticism of the golden ratio designed to intrigue the tourists on the walkway and adds symbolism to this welcoming space.
 Tuscany, is a reinterpretation of the Italian stately garden. In this space, species associated with Italy, such as olive, pomegranate, myrtle, tamarix or lavender, are mixed with others of Mexican origin such as yuccas, dasylirions, opuntias, agaves as well as many other species of varied origins. This space is characterized by the abundance and diversity of blooms, strong aromas and a singular beauty that produces the interbreeding of xerophytic species from different environments. Pale gravel, used as a cover,  is complemented by the dark greens of the Mediterranean.
 Guajira, located under the walkway that crosses the garden, has a diversity of cacti, xerophytic Mediterranean species and plants popular in classic gardening.

Location 

Desert City is located on the A1 highway, km 25, service road towards Madrid. In San Sebastián de los Reyes, Community of Madrid Spain. 

Its opening hours during the winter months are Monday to Friday from 10:00 a.m. to 7:00 p.m., Saturday, Sunday and holidays from 10:00 a.m. to 8:30 p.m. During the summer months it is from Monday to Friday from 10:00 a.m. to 8:00 p.m., Saturday, Sunday and holidays from 10:00 a.m. to 9:30 p.m.

The botanical garden, freely accessible, has a marked, accessible route designed to accommodate the needs of individuals as well as guided group visits. Free guided tours are held in the garden on weekends and holidays (11:00 am, 12:00 pm and 1:00 pm). Tour reservations are available via email.

See also 
 Xeriscaping
 Rainfed agriculture
 Mossèn Costa i Llobera Gardens
 Jardín de Cactus

References

External links 

 The natural environment of San Sebastián de los Reyes.
 Ibero-Macaronesian Association of Botanical Gardens
 Botanical gardens page of Spain
 Xeriscape Colorado
 City of Albuquerque
 Texas Agricultural Extension Service
 Southern Nevada Water Authority
 Colorado State University Cooperative Extension
 Center for the Study of the Built Environment's Water-Conserving Landscapes Project

Botanical gardens in Spain
Cactus gardens
2017 establishments in Spain
San Sebastián de los Reyes